Lawrence or Larry Hoffman may refer to:
Larry Hoffman (baseball) (1878–1948), 1900s infielder for the Chicago Orphans
Lawrence A. Hoffman (born 1942), liturgiologist
Lawrence J. Hoffman, American lawyer